Emmanuel Iyke Anyanwu  (born 15 November 1991) is a Nigerian footballer who plays as a defender for Kano Pillars. He is the younger brother of former Enyimba teammates Nnaemeka Anyanwu and Kenneth Anyanwu.

International career
He was called up in July 2010 for the Nigeria friendly against South Korea and made his debut in that game.
He has also played for the Flying Eagles and the Under-23 Olympic team.

References

Living people
Nigerian footballers
Nigeria under-20 international footballers
Nigeria international footballers
Association football defenders
Enyimba F.C. players
1991 births
2011 CAF U-23 Championship players
Place of birth missing (living people)